Orthotylus parvulus is a species of bug in the Miridae family that can be found in Bulgaria, Italy, Ukraine, and northwest Russia.

References

Insects described in 1879
Hemiptera of Europe
parvulus